Alfred Robert Morgan (born 1879) was an English professional footballer who played as a centre-half.

References

1879 births
People from Caistor
English footballers
Association football central defenders
Humber Trinity F.C. players
Grimsby All Saints F.C. players
Grimsby Town F.C. players
Grimsby Rangers F.C. players
English Football League players
Year of death missing